Winger is a surname.

Notable people with the surname include:

 Anna Winger (born 1970), American writer and artist
 Debra Winger (born 1955), American actress
 Kara Winger (born 1986), American track and field athlete
 Kip Winger (born 1961), American bass player and singer/songwriter
 Mark Winger (born 1962), American convicted murderer
 Odd Winger (19231998), Norwegian journalist, novelist, and children's writer
 Richard Winger (born 1943), American political activist and analyst
 Rob Winger (born 1974), Canadian poet